Scorpio is the name of several fictional characters appearing in American comic books published by Marvel Comics. Most of the characters to use the Scorpio identity have been supervillains affiliated with the Zodiac criminal cartel, and in this context were enemies of the Avengers and other superheroes.

Publication history
Jake Fury first appeared in Strange Tales #159 (Aug. 1967), and was created by Jim Steranko. He also appeared in Sgt. Fury and his Howling Commandos #68-69 (July–Aug. 1969).

The character subsequently appeared as Scorpio in Nick Fury, Agent of S.H.I.E.L.D. #1 (June 1968), #5 (Oct. 1968), The Avengers #72 (Jan. 1970), The Defenders #46 (April 1977), #48-49 (June–July 1977), #50 (Aug. 1977), West Coast Avengers vol. 2 Annual #1 (1986), West Coast Avengers vol. 2 #26-28 (Nov. 1987-January 1988), Wolverine/Nick Fury: The Scorpio Connection (1989), Fury #1 (May 1994), and Fury of S.H.I.E.L.D. #4 (July 1995).

Jacob Fury received an entry in the Official Handbook of the Marvel Universe Deluxe Edition #17.

Fictional character biography

Scorpio (Jake Fury)

Jacob "Jake" Fury was born in New York City. The character first appeared in Strange Tales #159 (Aug. 1967).

As a young man, he came to resent his brother Nick Fury. As the original Scorpio, he operated as a spy, terrorist, and criminal. Using his Scorpio secret identity, he first battled Nick at a Las Vegas S.H.I.E.L.D. base. He again battled Nick in Manhattan, then disguised himself as his brother to infiltrate the New York SHIELD base, although his real identity was then discovered by Nick. Nick later went undercover as Scorpio, and took his brother's place in the Zodiac who battled the Avengers. Disguised as Jacque LaPoint, he played a minor role in the Zodiac's attempt to kill all Manhattan residents born under the sign of Gemini (save for Zodiac's Gemini). He attempted to kidnap Kyle Richmond and battled the Defenders. Scorpio constructed a set of android Zodiac members to serve him in his base at Belleville, New Jersey. However, his plan was thwarted by the Defenders and he committed suicide through self-inflicted gunshot wound in despair.

In the final arc of the Secret Warriors series, it was revealed that Jake's death and much of his villainy was all part of a long-game plan of his brother's. In 1961, Jake was duplicated by ancient technology (which would later be developed and modernized as S.H.I.E.L.D.'s LMD program); the evil Jake would go on to be the agent known as Scorpio. The real Jake, however, was in deep cover within HYDRA, co-opting the identity of the high-ranking agent known as Kraken and infiltrating the highest rungs of the organization and helping his brother bring about its destruction.

LMD and Jacques LaPoint

Scorpio was later revived in an android body by the intelligent, extra-dimensional Zodiac Key from which he drew his power. The real Jacques LaPoint became the second Scorpio and led the Zodiac until Jake (in his second android body) killed him. Impersonating LaPoint, Fury led eleven other Zodiac-themed androids to kill and replace the rest of the human Zodiac members, and took over the organization's criminal operations. Scorpio and the other androids were deactivated when they were transported to the Zodiac Key's dimension of origin during a battle with the West Coast Avengers, and abandoned there.

Ecliptic Scorpio
Another Scorpio was the leader of Ecliptic's Zodiac team who fought Alpha Flight and was later massacred by Malcolm Colcord's Weapon X team.

Scorpio (Mikel Fury)

Mikel Fury, Nick Fury's illegitimate son, has also used the Scorpio identity. Mikel originally believed himself to be Jake Fury's son, and used a duplicate of the Zodiac Key to battle his father and Wolverine. When he learned that his mother had lied about his parentage, Mikel switched sides and became affiliated with S.H.I.E.L.D. for several months, following intensive therapy. When he was led to believe that the Punisher had killed Nick, he pursued the vigilante until persuaded to back down by fellow S.H.I.E.L.D. operatives and ousted from the agency. He makes a brief appearance in Secret Warriors, issue 11 as the leader from one of Nick's secret independent teams and is later killed in a mission.

Thanos' Zodiac
The sixth Scorpio is an unnamed man with a half-burned face who Thanos recruited to join his incarnation of the Zodiac. He and the other Zodiac members perish when Thanos abandons them on the self-destructing Helicarrier where Cancer was the only survivor.

Scorpio (Vernon Fury)
Vernon Fury is the grandson of Jacob Fury and the grand-nephew of Nick Fury. Upon being told the stories about the Zodiac Key, Vernon planned to know what its secrets are.

When he reached adulthood, Vernon Fury assumed the alias of "Vernon Jacobs" and became a big investor and shareholder of Parker Industries. With the money he obtained, he formed the different Zodiac sects.

Thanks to a premonition by Gemini, he hacks into a satellite owned by S.H.I.E.L.D. which he uses to look into the British Museum where a rosetta stone has Zodiac Grand Orrery in it.

When the planets that are shown in the Zodiac Grand Orrery get into alignment, Scorpio traveled back to his base in France. Spider-Man tracked the hacked satellite signal back to Vernon Jacobs' building. While in the Channel Tunnel, he transformed two of its staff members into becoming his next Cancer and Leo. While Spider-Man called his allies, Scorpio crashed the transmission stating that he will use his influence on Parker Industries enough to have it sink into the ground.

On his way to the Royal Observatory in Greenwich, Scorpio transforms two other people into Pisces and Taurus. At the Royal Observatory, Scorpio places the Zodiac Grand Orrery in the prime meridian there and performed a ritual that opened a secret passageway underground. Spider-Man and his allies arrived to stop Scorpio. When Scorpio steps into the door, he sees a year filled with events like Skyspear, Norman Osborn's latest activity, Regent's plot, the "New U" device, Doctor Octopus' return, another superhuman civil war, and the rise of the monsters. Catching Scorpio off guard, Spider-Man punched Scorpio into the doorway and locked it up. As Spider-Man suspects that Scorpio will have been teleported one year into the future, this would give S.H.I.E.L.D. time to prepare for Scorpio's return.

Powers and abilities
Jake Fury possessed a genius intellect, as well as basic army training, with an above average knowledge of hand-to-hand combat and streetfighting techniques. As Scorpio, Jake used the Zodiac Key to increase his physical abilities, and gain superhuman powers such as the ability to transform his body into sentient water for brief periods of time. Scorpio is totally dependent upon the Zodiac Key to maintain his superhuman powers. He did not have to be in physical contact with it to wield it. The Zodiac Key is a power object of extradimensional origin that taps an unidentified extradimensional energy for a variety of effects, including concussive force, electricity, magnetism, teleportation, physical transformation, etc. The Zodiac Key possesses sentience of a sort. After Jake Fury's death, the Zodiac Key employed his Theater of Genetics laboratory to create an android of Jake Fury.

Ecliptic's Zodiac had a barbed tail which was never used in combat. He also wielded a weapon similar to the Zodiac Key which displayed the ability to fire energy blasts and has a Zodiac teleportation device.

Other versions

Ultimate Marvel
The Ultimate Marvel version of Scorpio is mentioned to have been killed years earlier during a conflict in the Middle East, and now used by Nick Fury as an alias while undercover to infiltrate HYDRA.

In other media
 Scorpio appears in The Avengers: United They Stand, voiced by Wayne Best. This version is an alien with scorpion-like body parts, such as mandibles on his jaw, a claw for a right hand, and a tail on the back of his head, who serves as Taurus' right hand within Zodiac, can assume a human form, and has used the alias "Jake Fury".
 The Scorpio identity appears in The Super Hero Squad Show episode "From the Atom... It Rises!". Nick Fury (voiced by Kevin Michael Richardson) poses as Scorpio to figure out Doctor Doom's plans until the Abomination and MODOK discover Fury's identity.
 Scorpio appears in Marvel Anime: Iron Man, voiced by Kyle Hebert in the English dub. This version is a mass-produced, scorpion-like mech used by Zodiac.
 Scorpio appears in Ultimate Spider-Man, voiced by Phil Morris. This version is the African-American Max Fury, the younger brother of Nick Fury, and leader of Zodiac.

References

External links
 Scorpio (Jake Fury) at Marvel.com
 
 
 

Articles about multiple fictional characters
Characters created by Archie Goodwin (comics)
Characters created by Howard Chaykin
Characters created by Jim Steranko
Characters created by Don Heck
Characters created by Steve Englehart
Comics characters introduced in 1967
Comics characters introduced in 1974
Comics characters introduced in 1986
Comics characters introduced in 1989
Fictional characters from New York City
Fictional henchmen
Fictional secret agents and spies in comics
Fictional suicides
Marvel Comics code names
Marvel Comics cyborgs
Marvel Comics robots
Marvel Comics superheroes
Marvel Comics supervillains
Nick Fury